Arthur Raoul Andrew Koning (22 September 1944 – 10 July 2015) was a Dutch coxswain. He competed at the 1968 Summer Olympics in the eight event and finished in eighth place.

References

External links

 Arthur Koning's obituary 
 
 
 

1944 births
2015 deaths
Dutch male rowers
Olympic rowers of the Netherlands
Rowers at the 1968 Summer Olympics
Rowers from Amsterdam
Coxswains (rowing)